Zhaimu "Jimmy" Jambo (born 23 August 1987 in Harare) is a retired Zimbabwean footballer who last played as a left-footed defender for Kaizer Chiefs in the South African Premier Soccer League and Zimbabwe.

External links

1987 births
Living people
Association football defenders
Gunners F.C. players
Kaizer Chiefs F.C. players
Zimbabwean expatriate sportspeople in South Africa
Zimbabwean footballers
Expatriate soccer players in South Africa
Zimbabwe international footballers
Sportspeople from Harare